Hectorella is a genus of flowering plants belonging to the family Montiaceae. It is monotypic, being represented by the single species Hectorella caespitosa. It is native to New Zealand.

The genus name of Hectorella is in honour of James Hector (1834–1907), a Scottish-New Zealand geologist, naturalist and surgeon. The Latin specific epithet of caespitosa  refers to caespitose meaning tufted or turf-like, from caespes or  Cf. caespititius. Hectorella caespitosa was first described and published in Handb. N. Zeal. Fl. Vol.1 on page 27 in 1864.

References

Montiaceae
Endemic flora of New Zealand
Monotypic Caryophyllales genera
Plants described in 1864